Basílio Fernandes Marques (born 10 October 1966), is a Portuguese retired footballer who played as a left defender, and the current assistant manager of C.D. Nacional.

Marques has managed Vitória Guimarães on an interim basis on three occasions.

References

External links

1966 births
Living people
Sportspeople from Guimarães
Portuguese footballers
Association football defenders
Primeira Liga players
Vitória S.C. players
S.C. Campomaiorense players
Segunda Divisão players
F.C. Famalicão players
Portugal under-21 international footballers
Portuguese football managers
Primeira Liga managers
Vitória S.C. managers
Portuguese expatriates in Greece